Bobby's World (originally known as The World According to Bobby) is an American animated comedy children's television series that aired on Fox Kids from September 8, 1990 to February 23, 1998. The show was created by Canadian actor/comedian Howie Mandel, who also performs the voices of both Bobby and his father Howard Generic.

It was produced by Film Roman for Mandel's company Alevy Productions and Fox Children's Productions in association with 20th Century Fox Television and Saban International. The theme song for Bobby's World was composed by John Tesh and Michael Hanna.

Premise
The series follows the daily life of Bobby Generic, with his very overactive imagination and how he sees the world.

Episodes

Characters

Main

 Robert Adelvice "Bobby" Generic (voiced by Howie Mandel) – The main character of the series. He is a young 4- (5- in seasons 2 through 6, then 6- in seasons 7 and 8) year-old boy who loves to fantasize. An imaginative Bobby claims however that he came from his dreams. Scenes with Bobby most often involve elaborate literal interpretations of the popular or colloquial sayings uttered by other characters during the show (i.e. a "traffic jam" becomes Traffic Jam, as Bobby imagines spreading tiny cars and trucks on a piece of bread and taking a bite). When he enters contests, he tends to end up losing because Bobby ends up being himself instead of using his common sense. Bobby has spiky black hair. He wears a white shirt with red short sleeves (which also reveals his stomach exposed), red shorts and blue sneakers.

Family members
The Generic family's surname is pronounced "JEN-uh-rik", but mispronounced as "juh-NEHR-ik" by other characters as a running gag.

 Howard Generic (modeled upon and also voiced by Howie Mandel using his normal voice) – Bobby's father. He usually punishes his son Bobby by sending him to his room for his misbehaving.
 Martha Sven-Generic (voiced by Gail Matthius) – Bobby's mother, who has red hair and is often seen wearing a sky-blue tracksuit. She has a prominent Midwestern accent, and often peppered her speech with phrases like "Fer corn sakes", "Fer cryin' in the mud", "gee golly", "gosh darn" and "dont'cha know." Gail Matthius based Martha on her Saturday Night Live character, Roweena, a chain-smoking hairdresser.
 Kelly Generic (voiced by Charity James) – Bobby's 15-year-old tomboyish rebellious sister, the eldest Generic sibling, sporting a blonde shag haircut, purple eyeshadow, pink-striped tights, and a valley girl accent and manner, and often uses her catchphrase "Get real!" 
 Derek Generic (voiced by Kevin Michaels from 1990 to 1996, then Pamela Adlon from 1997 to 1998) – Bobby's 10-year-old brother, who is a bully with a rat-tail hairdo, slashed blue jeans, and a sarcastic manner. He always teases and insults his younger brother and tends to call him a "dork" or a "dweeb". Bobby has a bad habit of listening to him and Derek is often reprimanded by his parents for fooling his kid brother.
 Jake and Alex Generic - Bobby's younger twin brothers, who were introduced in Season 3 but mentioned in Season 2 as Martha was pregnant with them.
 Ruth Sven (voiced by Susan Tolsky) – Bobby's aunt and Martha's sister, She is a blonde, amply-contoured lady with a sweet, pretty face and her hair tied in a bun, and kindly ways. She is loving and affectionate toward her younger nephew and particularly likes to pinch his cheeks, which Bobby really doesn't go for. Like her brother Ted, she is unpartnered but unlike him, makes no attempt to seek a sweetheart. Part of her signature attire is knee-high stockings rolled into a ring at the cuffs.
 Ted Sven (voiced by Tino Insana) – Bobby's uncle and Martha and Ruth's brother. He is a blond, portly, jolly gentleman with a deep rough voice and his signature garment is a yellow shirt printed with red hearts. Uncle Ted is a fun-loving fellow who loves to joke around with Bobby and is a collector of various things, one of which is a novelty item called Socks in a Can. His last name is revealed to be Sven. He is unpartnered and his attempts to find a sweetheart end in disaster. He is also affectionate toward his youngest nephew and often calls him by the nickname "Bobbo." Bobby likes hanging out with Uncle Ted because he thinks of all kinds of fun stuff to do including giving Bobby noogies.
 Roger (vocal effects provided by Frank Welker) – The Generics' pet dog.
 Webbly - Bobby's stuffed toy spider.

Recurring
 Howie Mandel (portrayed by himself) – The show's creator in live-action who interacts with Bobby in the hybrid opening and ending scenes. In first-season episodes, the live-action Howie is Howard Generic and has the ability to change into his animated alter ego. Beginning with season two, and continuing until the end of the series, Howie and Howard Generic are two separate individuals.
 George (voiced by Pauly Shore) – The boyfriend of Kelly.
 Tiffany (voiced by Candi Milo) – One of Kelly's friends. She wears a hat.
 Amber (voiced by Candi Milo) – One of Kelly's friends.
 Andrea (voiced by Candi Milo) – Another one of Kelly's friends.
 Jackie (voiced by Debi Derryberry) – Bobby's best friend with the floor-length pigtails who has a crush on Bobby. She always kisses him (which he hates, having to constantly wipe her kisses off). Jackie speaks with a monotone voice.
 Charlotte – Rambunctious and sassy, Charlotte was the fun-loving adventurous girl who was famous for her dislike of chocolate, and her tendency to tease Bobby incessantly over minor things he does.
 Mrs. Orso (voiced by Edie McClurg) – Bobby and Jackie's teacher at Little Red Preschool.
 Meeker (voiced by Pat Fraley) and Snurd (voiced by Jeff Doucette from 1990 to 1991, then Rob Paulsen from 1991 to 1998) – A bumbling duo seen doing various jobs around town, whether it be mall cops, paramedics, or stage hands.
 Captain Squash (voiced by Gary Owens) – Captain Squash is Bobby's favorite superhero. He often appears to help Bobby in his imaginations.

Production

Development
Howie Mandel explained that he accidentally created the voice that would be later used to voice Bobby when he was choking on a piece of cake. Two of Mandel's friends Jim Fisher and Jim Staahl signed an agreement with the Fox Broadcasting Company's then newly created children's division in 1989. Fisher and Staahl asked Mandel to join them in creating a show based on Mandel's Bobby character and voice. Mandel explained that he believed Fox did not think his stand-up routines were "family entertainment." He, Fisher, and Staahl (co-producers) recalled stories from their childhoods as they discussed the formation of the show. Mandel said "that was the seed of Bobby's World." Later stories from the childhoods of writers Dianne and Peter Tilden along with Mitch Schauer were used as the basis of many of the stories. The other characters on the show were mixes of characteristics of the creators' parents' friends and relatives. Specifically, Uncle Ted was based on Fisher and Staahl's former comedy partner in a comedy trio formed by the three after leaving Chicago's Second City, called The Graduates. Ultimately, that partner Tino Insana read for and won the part of Uncle Ted.

Mitch Schauer drew the designs for the main characters. Bobby's character design was based on Schauer's then 4-year-old son.

On February 12, 2007, the character Bobby made a surprise appearance on an episode of Deal or No Deal.

Show format
Episodes often consist of a short live-action segment either before or after the main story (and sometimes both before and after). The segment would include Mandel describing some aspect of the story and often relating it back to his personal childhood. Sometimes during these segments, the character of Bobby would appear in animated form and converse with Mandel. Other times, a live action child would appear and exchange words with Mandel. Endings of the show also featured Mandel breaking the "fourth wall" by talking to viewers about the preceding episode. In some part of the episode, Bobby will break the fourth wall by telling the audience his perspective on life.

Music
The series' music was by Mark Koval.  The theme music was by John Tesh and Michael Hanna.

Possible revival
In an April 2006 online interview, Mandel expressed his desire for a possible reboot of the series.

In November 2014, it was announced that Mandel told a crowd at Comikaze that plans to revive the series were in motion.

Broadcast
During its original run, Bobby's World was seen on Fox Kids. After it was cancelled in 1998, reruns began airing on Fox Family until 2001.
 
The series was available in its entirety on Netflix instant streaming and Kabillion as well. It was available on Amazon Prime Instant Video. Episodes can occasionally be seen in syndication, on a variety of websites, on Netflix or on Comcast's OnDemand service.

In the United States, starting in 1996, the show was open-captioned; this was intended as an aid to help younger children learn to read.

In Canada, it aired on YTV and later, Teletoon Retro.

In Russian, it aired on Ren-TV, TV-3 and Jetix Play.

In Kazakhstan, is aired on Raisovka Television.

Home media
From 1994 to 1998, 20th Century Fox Home Entertainment released VHS titles of the series.

 Volume 1 – Uncle Ted's Excellent Adventure / The Visit To Aunt Ruth's
 Volume 2 – Bobby's Big Move / Bobby's Big Broadcast
 Volume 3 – Swim By Me / Jets, Choo Choos & Cars
 Fish Tales / Generics Under Construction
 Me & Roger

In 2004, Anchor Bay Entertainment released two best-of compilations, Classic Scratch 'n' Sniff Episodes and The Signature Episodes, on DVD in Region 1.

On December 15, 2011, it was announced that MoonScoop Group had acquired the rights to the series and planned to release all seven seasons of Bobby's World on DVD in Region 1 via Amazon.com's CreateSpace program in early 2012. These are manufacture-on-demand releases, available exclusively through Amazon.com.  All seasons were made available for purchase on March 13, 2012.

Video game
A video game adaptation of Bobby's World was made for the Super Nintendo Entertainment System in 1995. It was developed by Riedel Software Productions and published by Hi Tech Entertainment. Versions for the Sega Genesis and Game Boy were in development but both never released.

In the game, Bobby's mother tells him to clean his room. As he is cleaning his room, Bobby starts daydreaming about a toy. After beating a level, Bobby has another daydream about another toy that he puts away.

Bobby's World is a platform game. In some stages, the gameplay changes to something similar to a shoot 'em up. The player is asked to control Bobby and make him jump, squat, walk, run, and throw objects at the enemies – the objects often change according to the level's thematic – and use Webbly to defend Bobby. On some stages, Webbly can be used to do other things too, like reach higher platforms, throw it at their enemies or even using it as a mount.

The game is relatively short and can be finished in few minutes. On the title screen, there's the Start, Password and Options. The passwords works similar to Disney's Aladdin, wheres the player needs to organize the characters on the screen to continue your progress. In Options, the player can change the commands, increase/decrease lives and continues quantity (up to 5 on each one) and listen to the various music tracks or sound effects.

References

External links

 
 . Fox Kids
 
 
 
 Bobby's World at Don Markstein's Toonopedia. Archived from the original on February 22, 2018.

Fox Broadcasting Company original programming
Television series by 20th Century Fox Television
1990s American animated television series
Fox Kids
YTV (Canadian TV channel) original programming
1990 American television series debuts
1998 American television series endings
American children's animated comedy television series
Canadian children's animated comedy television series
American children's animated fantasy television series
Canadian children's animated fantasy television series
American television series with live action and animation
Canadian television series with live action and animation
Animated television series about children
Television shows adapted into video games
1990s American children's comedy television series
English-language television shows
Television series by Film Roman
Television series by Splash Entertainment
Television series by Saban Entertainment
Comedy franchises
Fantasy franchises